Christoffer Karlsson (born 27 January 1988) is a Swedish footballer who most recently played as a midfielder for Åtvidabergs FF.

He was bought by Djurgårdens IF from Åtvidaberg at the start of the 2005 season, and was loaned out to Åtvidaberg for 2005 and 2006 and joined Djurgården in 2007. After some bad years in Djurgården, he left the club when his contract expired after the 2009 season and returned to Åtvidaberg. Karlsson made his Allsvenskan debut on March 15, 2010 against Örebro SK.

References

External links

Christoffer Karlsson at Fotbolltransfers

1988 births
Allsvenskan players
Superettan players
Åtvidabergs FF players
Djurgårdens IF Fotboll players
Varbergs BoIS players
Swedish footballers
Sweden youth international footballers
Association football defenders
Living people
FC Linköping City players